Michaelophorus hodgesi is a species of moth in the genus Michaelophorus known from Puerto Rico.

References

Platyptiliini
Moths described in 1999
Endemic fauna of Puerto Rico